Yegor Bulychov and Others is a 1953 Soviet drama film directed by Yuliya Solntseva and Boris Zakhava. It was based on a play by Maxim Gorky which was later Yegor Bulychyov and Others.

Cast
 Dina Andreeva as Ksenia  
 Sergei Lukyanov as Egor Bulychov  
 Nina Nikitina as Glafira 
 Larisa Pashkova as Varvara  
 Nina Rusinova as Melanya

References

Bibliography 
 Michael Brashinsky & Andrew Horton. Russian Critics on the Cinema of Glasnost. Cambridge University Press, 1994.

External links 
 

1953 films
1953 drama films
Soviet drama films
1950s Russian-language films
Films based on works by Maxim Gorky
Films directed by Yuliya Solntseva
Soviet black-and-white films